The men's Greco-Roman 77 kilograms is a competition featured at the 2022 World Wrestling Championships, and was held in Belgrade, Serbia on 10 and 11 September 2022.

Results
Legend
 WO — Won by walkover

Finals

Top half

Section 1

Section 2

Bottom half

Section 3

Section 4

Repechage

Final standing

References

External links
Official website

Men's Greco-Roman 77 kg